Osinki is a rural locality (a village) in Saryevskoye Rural Settlement, Vyaznikovsky District, Vladimir Oblast, Russia. The population was 312 as of 2010. There are 8 streets.

Geography 
Osinki is located on the Tara River, 38 km northwest of Vyazniki (the district's administrative centre) by road. Yuryshki is the nearest rural locality.

References 

Rural localities in Vyaznikovsky District